The Cheyenne Mountain Complex is a Space Force installation and defensive bunker located in unincorporated El Paso County, Colorado, next to the city of Colorado Springs, at the Cheyenne Mountain Space Force Station, which hosts the activities of several tenant units. Also located in Colorado Springs is Peterson Space Force Base, where the North American Aerospace Defense Command (NORAD) and United States Northern Command (USNORTHCOM) headquarters are located.

Formerly the center for the United States Space Command and NORAD, the Complex monitored the air space of Canada and the United States for missiles, space systems, and foreign aircraft through its worldwide early-warning system. Since 2008, NORAD and the United States Space Command have been based at Peterson Space Force Base and the complex, re-designated as an Air Force station, is used for crew training and as a back-up command center if required.

The military complex has included, in the past, many units of NORAD, U.S. Space Command, Aerospace Defense Command (ADCOM), Air Force Systems Command, Air Weather Service, and Federal Emergency Management (FEMA). The complex's communication center is also used by the nearby U.S. Civil Defense Warning Center.

Facilities

Main chambers 

The complex was built under 2,000 feet of granite on five acres. Fifteen three-story buildings are protected from movement, e.g. earthquake or explosion, by a system of giant springs that the buildings sit on and flexible pipe connectors to limit the operational effect of movement. A total of more than 1,000 springs are designed to prevent any of the 15 buildings from shifting more than one inch. The complex is the only high-altitude Department of Defense facility certified to be able to sustain an electromagnetic pulse (EMP). There are a large quantity of cots for most of the personnel, including suites for high-ranking officers within the bunker. Amenities include a medical facility, store, cafeteria, and fitness centers inside and outside the mountain.

Blast doors 

The bunker is built to deflect a 30 megaton nuclear explosion as close as 1.2 miles. Within a mountain tunnel are sets of 25-ton blast doors and another for the civil engineering department. The doors were built so that they can always be opened when needed. Should a nuclear blast hit the building, they are designed to withstand a blast wave. There is a network of blast valves with unique filters to capture airborne chemical, biological, radiological, and nuclear contaminants.

Outdoor 

Outside of the military complex are the parking lots, a fire station, and outdoor recreational facilities. The recreational amenities include Mountain Man Park, picnic areas, a racquetball facility, softball field, sand volleyball court, basketball court, a putting green, and horseshoe area.

Support area 
The complex has its own power plant, heating and cooling system, and water supply. The 21st Mission Support Group ensures there is a 99.999% degree of reliability of its electricity, water, air conditioning, power, and other support systems. The threats, in descending order of likelihood, that the complex may face are "medical emergencies, natural disasters, civil disorder, a conventional attack, an electromagnetic pulse attack, a cyber or information attack, chemical or biological or radiological attack, an improvised nuclear attack, a limited nuclear attack, [and] a general nuclear attack." The least likely events are the most hazardous.

There is more water produced by mountain springs than the base requires, and a 1,500,000 gallon reservoir ensures that even in event of fire, there is enough water to meet the facility's needs. A reservoir of 4,500,000 gallon of water is used as a heat sink. There is a "massive" reservoir for diesel fuel and a "huge" battery bank with redundant power generators.

History

Construction and systems installation 

The North American Air Defense Command (NORAD) was established and activated at the Ent Air Force Base on September 12, 1957. The Command is a binational organization of Canadian (1 Canadian Air Division) and United States air defense command units, in accordance with NORAD Agreements first made on May 12, 1958.  In the late 1950s, a plan was developed to construct a command and control center in a hardened facility as a Cold War defensive strategy against long-range Soviet bombers, ballistic missiles, and a nuclear attack.

In 1957, the Strategic Air Command began construction in New England inside Bare Mountain for a hardened bunker to contain the command post for the 8th Air Force, which was located at nearby Westover Air Force Base, Chicopee, Massachusetts. This underground facility was nicknamed "The Notch" (or formally as the 8th AF "Post-Attack Command and Control System Facility, Hadley") and was hardened to protect it from the effects of a nearby nuclear blast and designed so that the senior military staff could facilitate further military operations.  Four years later, construction at Cheyenne Mountain was started to create a similar protection for the NORAD command post. Cheyenne Mountain was excavated under the supervision of the Army Corps of Engineers for the construction of the NORAD Combat Operations Center beginning on May 18, 1961, by Utah Construction & Mining Company.

The Space Defense Center and the Combat Operations Center achieved full operational capability on February 6, 1967. The total cost was $142.4 million. Its systems included a command and control system developed by Burroughs Corporation. The electronics and communications system centralized and automated the instantaneous (one-millionth of a second) evaluation of aerospace surveillance data. The Space Defense Center moved from Ent AFB to the complex in 1965. The NORAD Combat Operations Center was fully operational April 20, 1966 and The Space Defense Command's 1st Aerospace Control Squadron moved to Cheyenne Mountain that month. The following systems or commands became operational between May and October, 1966: The NORAD Attack Warning System, Combat Operations Command, and Delta I computer system, which recorded and monitored every detected space system. By January 4, 1967, the National Civil Defense Warning Center was in the bunker.

Operations and improvements

Air Defense Command satellite systems 
System Development Corporation updated Air Defense Command satellite information processing systems for $15,850,542 on January 19, 1973. The improvements were primarily to the Space Computational Center's displays and application software, which was updated to provide real-time positioning of orbiting space systems for the NORAD Combat Operation Center. The first phase, which established a system integrator and modernized the communications to a major data processing system, was completed in October 1972.

Ballistic Missile Defense Center 
The Ballistic Missile Defense Center (BMDC) BW 1.2 release was installed in February 1974 in the Combat Operations Center, under the command of CONAD. The Safeguard command and control system, operated by the commander, communicated warnings, observation data, and attack assessment to the Combat Operations Center. It was also designed to release nuclear weapons.

Combat Operations Center 
By 1978, five operating centers and a command post resided within the NORAD Combat Operations Center. The Space Computational Center catalogued and tracked space objects. The Intelligence Center analyzed intelligence data. Data was consolidated and displayed in the Command Post by the System Center. The Weather Support Unit monitored local and global weather patterns. The NORAD Commander's wartime staff reported to the Battle Staff Support Center.

Space Defense Operations Center 
The Space Defense Operations Center (SPADOC), established on October 1, 1979, consolidated United States Air Force satellite survivability, space surveillance, and US ASAT operations into one wartime space activities hub at the NORAD Cheyenne Mountain Complex. Space surveillance and missile warning functions were performed by the Core Processing Segment (CPS) using Worldwide Military Command and Control System's Honeywell H6080 computers at the SPADOC Computational Center (SCC) and NORAD Computer System (NCS). A third computer was operational backup for SCC or NCS. By 1981, the H6080 failed to meet the requirements for timely computations. SPADATS was deactivated about 1980, although some of its logic continued on in SPADOC systems.

Cheyenne Mountain Complex Improvements Program (427M) 
NORAD had a series of warning and assessment systems that were not fully automated in the Cheyenne Mountain complex into the 1970s. In 1979, the Cheyenne Mountain Complex Improvements Program 427M system became fully operational. It was a consolidated Cheyenne Mountain Upgrade program for command center, space, ballistic missile, and space functions, developed using new software technology and designed for computers with large processing capacity. There were three major segments of the 427M system: the Communication System Segment (CSS), NORAD Computer System (NCS), and Space Computational Center (SCC). The 425L Command and Control System, Display Information Processor, Command Center Processing System, and other hardware were replaced by the NORAD Computer System (NCS). The new system was designed to centralize several databases, improve on-line display capabilities, and consolidate mission warning information processing and transmission. It was intended to have greater reliability and quicker early warning capability. The Command Center Processing System's original UNIVAC 1106, re-purposed for Mission Essential Back-up Capability (MEBU), was upgraded to the more robust UNIVAC 1100/42. The 427M system, intended to modernize systems and improve performance, was initially "wholly ineffective" and resulted in several failures of the Worldwide Military Command and Control System (WWMCCS) system.

In 1979 and 1980, there were a few instances when false missile warnings were generated by the Cheyenne Mountain complex systems. For instance, a computer chip "went haywire" and issued false missile warnings, which raised the possibility that a nuclear war could be started accidentally, based upon incorrect data. Staff analyzed the data and found that the warnings were erroneous and the systems were updated to identify false alarms. Gen. James V. Hartinger of the Air Force stated that "his primary responsibility is to provide Washington with what he calls 'timely, unambiguous, reliable warning' that a raid on North America has begun." He explained that there are about 6,700 messages generated on average each hour in 1979 and 1980 and all had been processed without error. An off-site testing facility was established in Colorado Springs by NORAD in late 1979 or early 1980 so that system changes could be tested off-line before they were moved into production. Following another failure in 1980, a bad computer chip was updated and staff and commander processes were improved to better respond to warnings.

The Cheyenne Mountain Upgrade (CMU) of November 1988, designed to consolidate five improvement programs, was not installed because it was not compatible with other systems at Cheyenne Mountain and it did not meet the defined specifications according to deficiencies identified during testing. The five improvement programs were the CCPDS Replacement (CCPDS-R), CSS Replacement (CSS-R), Granite Sentry upgrade, SCIS, and SPADOC 4. SPADOC 4 was for upgrading the SCC with primary and backup 3090-200J mainframes), and SPADOC 4 block A achieved initial operating capability (IOC) in April 1989. The CSS-R "first element" achieved IOC on April 12, 1991; and the 427M system was replaced . The CSSR, SCIS, Granite Sentry, CCPDS-R, and their interfaces were tested in 1997. Testing of Granite Sentry nuclear detonation (NUDET) data processing system found it to be inadequate.

Joint Surveillance System 
The Joint Surveillance System (JSS), developed under an agreement with the Canadian government, became fully operational in seven Region Operations Control Centers (ROCCs) on December 23, 1983. The Joint Surveillance System was implemented to replace Semi-Automatic Ground Environment (SAGE).

Survivable Communications Integration System 
In 1986, Congress approved development of the Survivable Communications Integration System (SCIS) to communicate missile warning messages simultaneously over many forms of media, but it was subject to delays and cost overruns. By 1992, the project was estimated to be delayed to 1995 and cost projected to increase from $142 million to $234 million.

Other systems 
By 1992, the U.S. Space Command Space Surveillance Center (SSC) was the data analysis and tracking center for Baker-Nunn camera images and Cheyenne Mountain was connected to the AN/URC-117 Ground Wave Emergency Network (GWEN) communication site in Pueblo, Colorado. By 1995, the AN/FPS-129 HAVE STARE (Globus II) radar in California had been upgraded to "relay data to Cheyenne Mountain", and by October 1995 the 1st Command and Control Squadron (1CACS) in the bunker was providing space collision avoidance data to the Cheyenne Mountain Operations Center's space control center.

In June 1993, the Cheyenne Mountain Complex Operations Center had the USSPACE and NORAD Command Center, NORAD Air Defense Operations Center (ADOC), NORAD/USSPACECOM Combined Intelligence Watch Center (CIWC), USSPACECOM Space Defense Operations Center (SPADOC), USSPACECOM Space Surveillance Center (SSC), AFSPACECOM Weather Operations Center, and the AFSPACECOM Systems Center within its facility.

Plans to house the USSPACECOM and NORAD command centers in the same location began by July 1994. A $450 million upgrade was made to the missile warning center beginning in February 1995. The effort was part of a $1.7 billion renovation program for Cheyenne Mountain.

The Combatant Commander's Integrated Command and Control System (CCIC2S) program began in 2000 with a Lockheed Martin contract "to upgrade all of the mission systems within Cheyenne Mountain, which included the space surveillance systems" for delivery in 2006. The portion of CCIC2S modernizing "attack warning systems within Cheyenne Mountain [was to] cost more than $700 million from fiscal years 2000 to 2006", and the delayed CCIC2S upgrades for space surveillance were superseded by systems for the Joint Space Operations Center's Space C2 program and Integrated Space Situational Awareness program.

By 2003, consoles for the Ground-Based Mid-Course Defense (GMD) had been contracted for Cheyenne Mountain, and the planned 18 month Cheyenne Mountain Realignment to move Command Center operations to Peterson AFB was complete by May 13, 2008. On August 3, 2011, a ribbon cutting was held for the January 2010 – June 30, 2011, Missile Warning Center renovation funded by USSTRATCOM.

Over the years, the installation came to house elements of the North American Aerospace Defense Command (NORAD), U.S. Strategic Command, U.S. Air Force Space Command and U.S. Northern Command (USNORTHCOM). Under what became known as the Cheyenne Mountain Operations Center (CMOC), several centers supported the NORAD missions of aerospace warning and aerospace control and provided warning of ballistic missile or air attacks against North America.

Peterson and Vandenberg Air Force Bases 
On July 28, 2006, the Cheyenne Mountain Directorate was re-designated as the Cheyenne Mountain Division, with the mission to assist in establishing an integrated NORAD and USNORTHCOM Command Center within the headquarters building at Peterson Air Force Base. The Unified Space Vault and the Space Control Center were moved from Cheyenne Mountain to the Joint Space Operations Center at Vandenberg Air Force Base about October 2007.

In 2006, NORAD relocated to a basement in the Peterson No. 2 building at the nearby Peterson AFB. Northern Command and Space Command and Canadian military defense partners relocated at Peterson. The Cheyenne Mountain complex is maintained by a skeleton crew and no longer operates on a 24/7 basis. The complex is on "warm standby", meaning it is only staffed when required.

On the fiftieth anniversary of the NORAD agreement—May 12, 2008—the Command Center located within Cheyenne Mountain Complex was officially re-designated as the NORAD and USNORTHCOM Alternate Command Center. The Cheyenne Mountain Division of NORAD and USNORTHCOM was re-designated as the J36 branch within the NORAD and USNORTHCOM's Operations Directorates.

NORAD Alternate Command 
Since 2002, the complex has been classed as Cheyenne Mountain Air Force Station and has been used in crew qualification training, while the former command function has been redesignated as the "NORAD and USNORTHCOM Alternate Command Center" since 2008 after all the original functions of the complex were removed to Peterson Air Force Base. The complex is maintained by the 21st Mission Support Group which provides support and maintenance for the 'NORAD/USNORTHCOM's training, exercise and alternate command center functions, U.S. Strategic Command's Missile Warning Center, Detachment 2 of the 17th Test Squadron, Air Force Technical Applications Center's research laboratory, the Defense Intelligence Agency's Western Continental United States Regional Service Center'.

Cheyenne Mountain Air Force Station is owned and operated by Air Force Space Command. NORAD and USNORTHCOM now use just under 30% of the floor space within the complex and comprise approximately 5% of the daily population at Cheyenne Mountain. The Cheyenne Mountain Complex serves as NORAD and USNORTHCOM's Alternate Command Center and as a training site for crew qualification. Day-to-day crew operations for NORAD and USNORTHCOM typically take place at Peterson Air Force Base.

Migration of NORAD communications to Cheyenne Mountain 
In early 2015, Admiral William E. Gortney, commander of NORAD and NORTHCOM, announced a $700 million contract with Raytheon to move systems into the complex to shield it from electromagnetic pulse attack, with additional work to be done at Vandenberg and Offutt. According to Gortney, "because of the very nature of the way that Cheyenne Mountain's built, it's EMP-hardened. And so, there's a lot of movement to put capability into Cheyenne Mountain and to be able to communicate in there".

Units 
Electronic Systems Division Detachment 10 at Ent AFB became the Cheyenne Mountain Complex Management Office (CMCMO) in 1963, the year the Chidlaw Combined Operations Center began operations; and on February 15, 1980, ESD Detachment 2 was established at the "Cheyenne Mountain Complex" (Det 2 became the AFSC focal point during the Cheyenne Mountain Upgrade.) Aerospace Defense Command organizations in the bunker became a specified command when the major command ended in 1980; e.g., the J31 unit of HQ NORAD/ADCOM subsequently manned the Space Surveillance Center in the same room as the Missile Warning Center (separated by partitions). The "HQ Cheyenne Mountain Support Group ... was activated at the Cheyenne Mountain Complex" in October 1981 to support the Aerospace Defense Center's operation of the NORAD combat operations center". In 1983 the Foreign Technology Division had an operating location at the bunker and in 1992, an airman of the "1010th Civil Engineering Squadron at Cheyenne Mountain Air Force Base" developed a 3-D AutoCAD model of the bunker "to zoom in on a specific room".

By 1995 a "missile operations section" supported the missile warning center, and in 2001 the 1989 1CACS at the Cheyenne Mountain Air Force Station was renamed the 1st Space Control Squadron. On June 24, 1994, when the "Joint Task Force – Cheyenne Mountain Operations organization was brought online to take responsibility for the installation", Brig. Gen. Donald Peterson was the commander of the JTF, which was renamed the "U.S. Space Command Cheyenne Mountain operations center" by March 1995 (the unit had an exercise branch in June 1996). On July 28, 2006, the Cheyenne Mountain Realignment redesignated the Cheyenne Mountain Directorate to the Cheyenne Mountain Division. Circa 2004 the bunker included the 17th Test Squadron's Detachment 2 and AFTAC's research laboratory, in 2008 Detachment 1 of the 392d Training Squadron operated the Cheyenne Mountain Training System (CMTS), and in 2011 the installation's 721st SFS was expanded.

In popular culture

Movies 
 WarGames (1983) is set partly at the command center, where it was codenamed "Crystal Palace."

Television 
 In Stargate SG-1 and its spin-offs, Cheyenne Mountain houses "Stargate Command", a top-secret unit of the United States Air Force that uses the titular Stargate to explore other planets. In recognition of the series' close relationship with the real-life Air Force, there is now a broom closet in the real Cheyenne Mountain Complex called "Stargate Command".
 The bunker is also a setting in the series Jeremiah.

Video Games
 Horizon: Zero Dawn Cheyenne Mountain is known as All-Mother Mountain, and the Complex has been retrofitted as a Cradle facility prior to the apocalypse. The protagonist, Aloy, was found inside the facility.

See also 
 Kosvinsky Kamen – a potential Soviet/Russian counterpart
 Mount Yamantau – a potential Soviet/Russian counterpart

 North American Aerospace Defense Command
 Raven Rock Mountain Complex
 Aerospace Defense Command
 United States Space Command
 Related Colorado Springs military installations
 Cheyenne Mountain Air Force Station
 Peterson Air Force Base
 Ent Air Force Base
 Chidlaw Building

Notes

References

External links 

Installations of the United States Air Force in Colorado
 
Government buildings completed in 1965
History of Colorado Springs, Colorado
Military history of Colorado
National air defence operations centres
North American Aerospace Defense Command
Nuclear bunkers in the United States
Continuity of government in the United States